Franck Grandel (born 17 March 1978) is a Guadeloupean former professional footballer who played as a goalkeeper.

Club career
Born in Pointe-à-Pitre, Guadeloupe, Grandel started his career with Club Colonial on Martinique. He made his professional debut for Racing Besançon in the Championnat National during the 1999–2000 season.

After two seasons in the club from Franche-Comté, he joined FC Libourne, competing for the championship of the fourth-tier Championnat National 2. He played there for two seasons before moving to Greek club Skoda Xanthi ahead of the 2003–04 season. During the 2004–05 season, he returned to France where he signed for Ligue 2 club Troyes AC. At the end of the season, the club finished in third place in the league and found themselves promoted to the Ligue 1. After this feat was reached, he signed a three-year contract with Dutch Eredivisie club FC Utrecht in 2005, where he was seen as the successor to René Ponk who had left for Sparta Rotterdam. Under the leadership of head coach Foeke Booy, he made his debut in the Eredivisie on 14 August 2005, when FC Utrecht drew 0–0 against NEC Nijmegen. In the course of his first season, Grandel alternated between great saves and several blunders, which mockingly became known as Grandelletjes ("Grandels"). He was released from his contract with Utrecht in November 2007.

He signed a two-year contract with French Ligue 2 side Dijon FCO just before the 2009 CONCACAF Gold Cup. Lacking playing time, he left the club after two seasons.

In 2011, he joined USL Dunkerque in the fourth division with whom he won the Championnat de France Amateur in 2013 and promoted to Championnat National.

In 2013, he returned to Troyes AC, who had just been relegated to Ligue 2, to be the backup. In 2015, the club won the Ligue 2 title, but he failed to make any league appearances that season, or the following season in Ligue 1.

International career
During the 2007 CONCACAF Gold Cup, when Guadeloupe surprisingly advanced to the tournament semifinals, Grandel was given top goalkeeper award and was also named to the tournament All-star team. He had to leave the 2009 Gold Cup squad because of injury.

Honours
USL Dunkerque
Championnat de France Amateur: 2012–13

Guadeloupe
 CONCACAF Gold Cup Top Goalkeeper: 2007
 CONCACAF Gold Cup All-Tournament team: 2007

References

External links
 Weltfussball 

 
 Career stats - Voetbal International
 

1978 births
Living people
French footballers
Guadeloupean footballers
Association football goalkeepers
Guadeloupe international footballers
Ligue 2 players
Championnat National players
Championnat National 2 players
Super League Greece players
Eredivisie players
FC Mulhouse players
Racing Besançon players
FC Libourne players
Xanthi F.C. players
ES Troyes AC players
FC Utrecht players
Dijon FCO players
USL Dunkerque players
2007 CONCACAF Gold Cup players
2011 CONCACAF Gold Cup players
US Boulogne non-playing staff
French expatriate footballers
French expatriate sportspeople in Greece
Expatriate footballers in Greece
French expatriate sportspeople in the Netherlands
Expatriate footballers in the Netherlands